Harold James "Joe" Meehan (5 April 1911 – 29 July 1967) was an Australian rules footballer who played with Hawthorn and South Melbourne in the Victorian Football League (VFL).

Meehan was the younger brother of Fitzroy player Tom Meehan.

Meehan played 62 games with Camberwell Football Club from 1934 to 1938.

Notes

External links 

Joe Meehan's playing statistics from The VFA Project

1911 births
1967 deaths
Australian rules footballers from Victoria (Australia)
Hawthorn Football Club players
Camberwell Football Club players
Sydney Swans players
Dandenong Football Club players